The Michigan Collegiate Hockey Conference (MCHC) is a Men's ACHA Division 3 conference made up of smaller colleges and universities in the state of Michigan.

Championship History

ACHA National Champions
The MCHC has produced thirteen National Championship teams, the most of any Division 3 conference, including Ferris State (1994), Muskegon Community College (2003), Calvin College (2004), Saginaw Valley State (2009, 2010), Adrian College-Gold (2012, 2013, 2014), Michigan State (2015), Oakland (2016), and Hope College (2018, 2021, 2022). SVSU became the first school in Division 3 history to not only win two National Championships, but to do it in back-to-back years. Adrian College-Gold later became the first school in Division 3 history to not only make three straight National Championship Games, but to win all three.

ACHA National Runners-up
The MCHC has produced eleven National Runners-up including Hope College (2003, 2010, 2011, 2014), Northwood (2006), Davenport (2012), Michigan-Flint (2013), Aquinas College (2016), Calvin (2017), Oakland (2018) and Michigan (2022). Hope College is the first school in Division 3 to make it to four National Championship games.

ACHA National Championship Game
The ACHA Division 3 National Championship game has featured two MCHC teams nine times since 2003. Muskegon Community College & Hope College in 2003, Saginaw Valley State & Hope College in 2010, Adrian College-Gold & Davenport in 2012, Adrian College-Gold & Michigan-Flint in 2013, Adrian College-Gold & Hope College in 2014, Oakland & Aquinas College in 2016, Aquinas College & Calvin in 2017, Hope College & Oakland in 2018 and Hope College & Michigan in 2022. Hope College is currently defending (2021, 2022) back-to-back champions.

2003: Muskegon Community College (1) defeated Hope College.
2009:Saginaw Valley State (1) defeated Florida Gulf Coast.
2010: Saginaw Valley State (2) defeated Hope College.
2012: Adrian College-Gold (1) defeated Davenport.
2013: Adrian College-Gold (2) defeated Michigan-Flint.
2014: Adrian College-Gold (3) defeated Hope College.
2015: Michigan State (1) defeated Florida Gulf Coast.
2016: Oakland (1) defeated Aquinas College.
2017: Aquinas College (1) defeated Calvin.
2018: Hope College (1) defeated Oakland.
2021: Hope College (2) defeated Arkansas.
2022: Hope College (3) defeated Michigan.

Vezina Cup Champions

Totals

Current teams
East Division

West Division

Former Members
Indiana Institute of Technology
Northwood University

External links
Official website
Adrian College-Black Bulldogs
Calvin College Knights
Central Michigan Chippewas
Davenport Panthers
Ferris State Bulldogs
Grand Valley State Lakers
Hope College Flying Dutchmen
Lawrence Tech Blue Devils
Michigan Wolverines
Michigan-Flint
Michigan State Spartans
Oakland Golden Grizzlies
Saginaw Valley State Cardinals
Western Michigan Stallions

Ice hockey in Michigan
ACHA Division 3 conferences